Elections for East Lothian Council took place in May 1974, alongside elections to the councils of Scotland's various other districts.

Aggregate results

Ward Results

Labour
 Musselburgh 1
 Musselburgh 2
 Musselburgh 3
 Musselburgh 4
 Tranent 
 Ormiston
 Inveresk
 Prestonpans 
 Preston 
 Gladsmuir

Conservative
 Cockenzie
 Lammermuir
 Dirleton
 Dunbar
 East Linton
 North Berwick

Independent
 Haddington

References

1974
1974 Scottish local elections